Helicella itala is a species of medium-sized, air-breathing land snail, a terrestrial pulmonate gastropod mollusk in the family Geomitridae, the hairy snails and their allies. 

English common name is Heath snail.

Subspecies
 Helicella itala itala (Linnaeus, 1758)
 Helicella itala pampelonensis (A. Schmidt, 1855)

Life cycle 
The size of the egg is 1.5 mm.

This species of snail makes and uses love darts during mating.

Description
The 12–20 mm. shell is broad and very depressed with an open coil forming a convex, low spire. The umbilicus is very wide. The whorls are slightly convex and have shallow sutures. The aperture is elliptical and lacks an internal rib. The surface (periostracum)  is white or pale yellow-brown and dark brown or yellow-brown spiral bands and fine irregular growth ridges.

Distribution

The common Heath snail is a West Palearctic species found in the British Isles, France, Spain, Belgium, Netherlands, Switzerland, Denmark, Germany, Austria, Czech Republic, and Poland.

Habitat
The animals live on dry, exposed habitats, such as roadsides and railway embankments, vegetated sand dunes and rock boulders and short grassland. They rise up to 2000 m above sea level in the Alps and Pyrenees.

References

 Provoost, S.; Bonte, D. (Ed.) (2004). Animated dunes: a view of biodiversity at the Flemish coast [Levende duinen: een overzicht van de biodiversiteit aan de Vlaamse kust]. Mededelingen van het Instituut voor Natuurbehoud, 22. Instituut voor Natuurbehoud: Brussel, Belgium. . 416, ill., appendices pp.

External links
Helicella itala  at Animalbase taxonomy, short description, distribution, biology,status (threats), images
 Linnaeus, C. (1758). Systema Naturae per regna tria naturae, secundum classes, ordines, genera, species, cum characteribus, differentiis, synonymis, locis. Editio decima, reformata [10th revised edition, vol. 1: 824 pp. Laurentius Salvius: Holmiae]

Helicella
Palearctic molluscs
Gastropods described in 1758
Taxa named by Carl Linnaeus